The Independent Girls' Schools Sports Association of South Australia (IGSSA) is a group of independent schools in South Australia involved in a variety of sporting and cultural activities.

Current member schools

Sports
 Athletics
 Badminton
 Basketball
 Hockey
 Netball
 Soccer
 Softball
 Swimming
 Tennis
 Volleyball

See also 
 List of schools in South Australia
 Independent Schools Sports Association (South Australia)

External links
 IGSSA website

Australian school sports associations
School sport associations
Sports governing bodies in South Australia